Paul Brasch is a stand-up comedian from Brisbane, Australia. He has appeared on The Midday Show, Hey Hey It's Saturday, The Comedy Channel's Headliners and Stand Up Australia, and various other television shows, as well as a stint on radio in The Paul Brasch Comedy Hour on Triple M.

He collaborates occasionally with comics Chris Wainhouse and Davo on side projects. One of these projects was "Diablo" which was performed at the Adelaide Comedy Festival in 2006. "Diablo" was a show based on hate and had people walking out mid-performance. Brasch has been quoted as saying that some people are never meant to get some comedy or what would be the point.
He recently completed his trilogy of comedy festival shows at the 2012...2013 and 2014 Brisbane Comedy Festivals.
The shows were 2012's ' Brisbane '...2013's ' Superheroes ' ...and 2014's ' Haunted House '
More recently Paul has been working almost exclusively on cruise ships around the world as well as live performances in L.A. and Las Vegas. He recently completed his Rock n Roll Comedy trilogy combining comedy with the music of the 50's..60's..70's and 80's. Part 4 has been delayed because of Covid 19.

Paul is 54 years old.

References

External links
 Paul Brasch Comedy footage at YouTube

Australian stand-up comedians
Living people
Australian male comedians
Year of birth missing (living people)